China competed in the 1986 Asian Games which were held in Seoul, South Korea from September 20, 1986 to October 5, 1986.

See also
 China at the Asian Games
 China at the Olympics
 Sport in China

Nations at the 1986 Asian Games
1986
Asian Games